The Last Days of Mankind is a satirical play by Karl Kraus. It is considered one of the most important of Kraus's works.

One third of the play is drawn from documentary sources and is highly realistic, except the final scenes which are of expressionist genre.

Notes and references

Further reading
"Die letzten Tage der Menschheit" im Bunker, Spiegel Online, April 22, 1999

External links 
Hanns Eisler
Die letzten Tage der Menschheit, in German at Project Gutenberg
Website with iconography to all scenes www.letztetage.com

20th-century German literature
German-language plays
1918 plays